K-T.V. (also known as Kids TV) was a children's network broadcast in Scandinavia, the Netherlands, Belgium, Greece, Cyprus and South Africa as a programming block on M-Net and later on FilmNet. It was owned by Multichoice. In Greece, it used to air in the morning and afternoon on Alfa TV exclusively for NOVA.Its sister programming block was K-TV World (also known as K-World), which aired mostly in the afternoon, while K-T.V. aired in the morning.

History
Scandinavia and the Netherlands: It was a programming block on Filmnet (temporary called FilmNet Plus and renamed later as FilmNet 1 in Sweden), from January 1, 1993 to January 11, 1997. It was broadcasting in the mornings and the noon/afternoon. It had a sister programming block called "K-TV mini".
Greece: The network was replaced on October 1, 2001, by Fox Kids. However, the site and the club were still active.
Cyprus: It was a programming block on Alfa TV, until January 2002, when it was replaced by a Nickelodeon one. The block is not to be confused with Kids TV, the K-T.V. block's spiritual successor, independently managed by the channel itself.

Programming
Note: It is possible that some of the shows listed below are broadcast only in international versions of the network.

64 Zoo Lane
A Bunch of Munsch
A Miss Mallard Mystery
Aaahh!!! Real Monsters
Ace Lightning
Ace Ventura: Pet Detective
Action Man (1995)
Action Man (2000)
Adventures of Grady Greenspace
Adventures of Sonic the Hedgehog
Aladdin
All Grown Up!
All That
Allegra's Window
All-New Dennis the Menace
Alvin and the Chipmunks
Anatole
Angelina Ballerina
Angel Wings
Angela Anaconda
Animaniacs
Anne of Green Gables
Anthony Ant
Aquila
Argai: The Prophecy
Around the World with Willy Fog
Arthur
As Told by Ginger
Babar
Babar and the Adventures of Badou
Back at the Barnyard
Bad Dog
Bakugan Battle Brawlers
Bananas in Pyjamas
Barney & Friends
Basket Fever
Batman of the Future
Battletoads
Bear in the Big Blue House
Being Ian
Betty's Bunch
Biker Mice from Mars
Bill and Ben
Bill and Ted's Excellent Adventures
Bill Nye the Science Guy
Billy the Cat
Birdz
Blake and Mortimer
Blaster's Universe
Blazing Dragons
Blue's Clues
Bob the Builder
Bobby's World
Bonkers
Bo on the Go!
Boo!
Boohbah
Bouli
Braceface
Bratz
Breaker High
Budgie the Little Helicopter
Bugs Bunny and Friends
Bumpety Boo
Bush Beat
C.L.Y.D.E.
Caillou
Caitlin's Way
Camp Candy
Camp Lazlo
Capertown Cops
Captain N: The Game Master
Captain Zed and the Zee Zone
Caribou Kitchen
Carl Squared
Casper and Friends
Casper Classics
CatDog
Channel Umptee-3
Charlie Chalk
Children of the New Forest
Chip 'n Dale: Rescue Rangers
Christopher Crocodile
Chuck Finn
Chucklewood Critters
Chuggington
Clang Invasion
Clarissa Explains It All
Clifford the Big Red Dog
Coconuts
Code Lyoko
Conan the Adventurer
Connie the Cow
Corduroy Bear
Count Duckula
Courage the Cowardly Dog
Cousin Skeeter
Cow and Chicken
Crazylegs Crane
Crocadoo
Cubeez
Cupido
Cyrano 2022
Danny Phantom
Darkwing Duck
Dennis and Gnasher
Delilah and Julius
Dennis the Menace
Denver, the Last Dinosaur
Dexter's Laboratory
Diabolik
Digimon
Dinky Di's
Dink, the Little Dinosaur
Dinosaucers
DinoSquad
Dinozaurs
Dino-Riders
Dive, Olly! Dive!
Di-Gata Defenders
Dog City
Dogtanian and the Three Muskehounds
Donkey Kong Country
Dora the Explorer
Doug
Dragon Tales
Dream Street
DuckTales
Dumbo's Circus
Ed, Edd n' Eddy
Eekstravaganza
Eerie, Indiana: The Other Dimension
Elliot Moose
Enchanted Tales
Engie Benjy
Ethelbert the Tiger
Eugénie Sandler P.I.
Eureeka's Castle
Extreme Dinosaurs
Fantaghirò
Fantastic Adventures of the Ugly Duckling
Fantastic Max
Fantomcat
Fantômette
Fennec
Fifi and the Flowertots
Figure It Out
Flight Squad
Flipper and Lopaka
Flying Rhino Junior High
Football Stories
Foxbusters
Frankenstein's Cat
Franklin
Franny's Feet
Free Willy
Funny Little Bugs
G2G
Gadget Boy & Heather
Garfield and Friends
Gargoyles
Gaspard and Lisa
George and Martha
George Shrinks
Global GUTS
Godzilla
Gofrette
Goof Troop
Goosebumps
Gordon the Garden Gnome
Guess with Jess
Gullah Gullah Island
Gypsy Girl
Hammerman
Happy Ness: The Secret of the Loch
Harry and His Bucket Full of Dinosaurs
Heathcliff and the Catillac Cats
Hello! Sandybell
Henry's World
Hey Arnold!
Hi-5
Hills End
Hilltop Hospital
Histeria!
Hoot Kloot
Horrid Henry
Hot Shots
Inspector Gadget
Inspector Gadget's Field Trip
 Invader Zim
It's a Big Big World
Jakers! The Adventures of Piggley Winks
James Bond Jr.
Jay Jay the Jet Plane
Jim Button and Luke the Engine Driver
Jim Henson's Muppet Babies
Johnny Bravo
Johnson and Friends
Journey to the Heart of the World
Journey to the West – Legends of the Monkey King
Just Jordan
KaBlam!
Katie and Orbie
Kenan and Kel
Ketchup: Cats Who Cook
Kingdom Adventure
Kipper
Kong: The Animated Series
Lamb Chop's Play Along
Lapitch the Little Shoemaker
LazyTown
The Legend of Prince Valiant
Legends of the Hidden Temple
Liberty's Kids
Life with Louie
Lifeboat Luke
Little Bear
Little Bill
Little Einsteins
Little Grey Rabbit
Little Hippo
Little Monsters
Little Red Tractor
Little Rosey
 Little Robots
Looney Tunes
Lucky Luke
 Lunar Jim
M.A.S.K.
Mac and Muttley
Madison's Adventures: Growing Up Wild
Maggie and the Ferocious Beast
Magilla Gorilla
Maisy
Make Way for Noddy
Martha Speaks
Max & Ruby
McGee and Me!
Men in Black: The Series
Merlin the Magical Puppy
Milo's Bug Quest
Mimi and Mr. Bobo
Miraculous Mellops
Missy Milly
Mona the Vampire
Monster Farm
Moomin
Mortal Kombat: Defenders of the Realm
Mousercise
Mr. Bogus
Mrs. Pepper Pot
Mummies Alive!
Mummy Nanny
My Best Friend Is an Alien
My Brother and Me
My Little Pony 'n Friends
My Little Pony Tales
Mythic Warriors: Guardians of the Legend
Naturally Sadie
Nico
Nilus the Sandman
No Sweat
Noah Knows Best
Noah's Island
Noddy in Toyland
Noozles
Ocean Girl
Oh Yeah! Cartoons
Old Bear Stories
Old MacDonald's Sing-A-Long Farm
Orson and Olivia
Oscar and Friends
Oscar's Orchestra
OWL/TV
P.C. Pinkerton
Pablo the Little Red Fox
Panshel's World
Pat and Stan
Pearlie
Peep and the Big Wide World
Peppa Pig
Pet Alien
Piggeldy and Frederick
Piggsburg Pigs!
Pipsqueak's Planet
Pinky Dinky Doo
Pippi Longstocking
Pirates of Dark Water
Pocket Dragon Adventures
Pocoyo
Poddington Peas
Poko
Pole Position
Polterguests
Poochini's Yard
Popeye the Sailor
PoppetsTown
Postman Pat
Postman Pat Special Delivery Service
Potamus Park
Potsworth & Co
Power Rangers Lost Galaxy
Preston Pig
Princess of the Nile
Princess Sissi
ProStars
Pumper Pups
The Puzzle Place
Rainbow Fish
Rambo: The Force of Freedom
Raw Toonage
Redwall
Renaade
Rescue Heroes
Richie Rich
Ric the Raven
Rimba's Island
Ripley's Believe It or Not!
Robinson Sucroe
Rock 'n Cop
Rocket Power
Rocko's Modern Life
Rocky and the Dodos
Rolie Polie Olie
RollBots
Romuald the Reindeer
Roswell Conspiracies: Aliens, Myths and Legends
Rubbadubbers
Ruby Gloom
Rugrats
Rupert
Saban’s Gulliver’s Travels
Saban's Adventures of Oliver Twist
Saban's Adventures of the Little Mermaid
Saber Rider and the Star Sheriffs
Sabrina: The Animated Series
Sailor Moon
Saved by the Bell
Scaredy Squirrel
Scooby and Scrappy-Doo
Scooby-Doo, Where Are You!
War Planets
Sesame Street
Sharky & George
Sherlock Holmes in the 22nd Century
Sherlock Hound
Shuriken School
Simsala Grimm
Sitting Ducks
Sonic Underground
Sooper Puppy
Speed Racer: The Next Generation
Spellbinder
Spider-Man Unlimited
SpongeBob SquarePants
Sport Billy
Spot
Star Wars: Droids
Star Wars: Ewoks
Steel Riders
Stoppit and Tidyup
Strawberry Shortcake
Sunkist Kids
Superbook
Swamp Thing
Sweet Valley High
Sylvanian Families
TaleSpin
Taz-Mania
Teenage Mutant Ninja Turtles
Teletubbies
The Addams Family
The Adventures of Blinky Bill
The Adventures of Buzzy Bee and Friends
The Adventures of Captain Pugwash
The Adventures of Jimmy Neutron Boy Genius
The Adventures of Paddington Bear
The Adventures of Pete and Pete
The Adventures of Sam & Max: Freelance Police
The Adventures of Sam
The Adventures of Tintin
The Amanda Show
The Angry Beavers
The Animal Shelf
The Baskervilles
The Berenstain Bears
The Busy World of Richard Scarry
The Care Bears
The Charlie Brown and Snoopy Show
The Chipmunks Go to the Movies
The Country Mouse and the City Mouse Adventures
The Dreamstone
The Elephant Show
The Fantastic Adventures of the Ugly Duckling
The Fairly OddParents
The Flintstones
The Flying House
The Forgotten Toys
The Further Adventures of SuperTed
The Get Along Gang
The Hoobs
The Hydronauts
The Jetsons
The Journey of Allen Strange
The Karate Kid
The Kids from Room 402
The Koala Brothers
The Lampies
The Legend of Zelda
The Lion King's Timon & Pumbaa
The Lionhearts
The Little Flying Bears
The Little Mermaid
The Magic School Bus
The Magician's House
The Mask
The Mickey Mouse Club
The Mr. Men Show
The Neverending Story
The New Adventures of He-Man
The New Adventures of Ocean Girl
The New Adventures of Robin Hood
The New Adventures of Winnie the Pooh
The New Pink Panther Show
The Octonauts
 The Paz Show
The Pinky and Perky Show
The Powerpuff Girls
The Prince of Atlantis
The Real Story of...
The Ren and Stimpy Show
The Save-Ums!
The Secret Files of the Spy Dogs
The Secret World of Benjamin Bear
The Shelly T. Turtle Show
The Silver Brumby
The Smurfs
The Super Mario Bros. Super Show!
The Three Friends and Jerry
The Tick
The Toothbrush Family
The Torch
The Trap Door
The Triplets
The Wild Thornberrys
The Wizard of Oz
The Wombles
The Woody Woodpecker Show
The World of Peter Rabbit and Friends
The Wubbulous World of Dr. Seuss
Theodore Tugboat
Thomas the Tank Engine & Friends
Thunderbirds
Tic Tac Toons
Tiny Planets
Tiny Toon Adventures
Toad Patrol
ToddWorld
Tom and Jerry Kids
Tom and Sheenah
Topo Gigio
Totally Spies!
Tots TV
Toxic Crusaders
Tractor Tom
Transformers: Robots in Disguise
Tristan and Isolde
Twinkle, the Dream Being
Twipsy
Unfabulous
Vampires, Pirates and Aliens
Van Pires
Video Power
Wake, Rattle and Roll
Wallace and Gromit
Watership Down
We All Have Tales
What about Mimi?
What-a-Mess
Where's Wally?
Wide World of Kids
Widget
Wiggly Park
Wild West C.O.W.-Boys of Moo Mesa
Wilbur
WildC.A.T.s
Wildside
William's Wish Wellingtons
Willy Fog: 20.000 Leagues Under the Sea
Wish Kid
Winx Club
Wonder Why?
Wondrous Myths & Legends
Wowser
Wunschpunsch
Xcalibur
X-DuckX
X-Men
Yippee, Yappee and Yahooey
Yogi Bear
Yolanda, the Black Corsair's Daughter
Zak Tales
Zoboomafoo
Zombie Hotel
Zoobilee Zoo
Zoo Life with Jack Hanna
Z-Squad

Playback
Playback was a weekly K-T.V. original TV show, presented by Jenna Dover. There, you could vote for your favourite video each week and win prizes.

Ti Paizei
Ti Paizei (Greek: Τι Παίζει) was an original production for the Greek counterpart of the network, presented by Banta Rapti, George Menediatis and Mary Blaxou.

Music Mail
Music Mail (Greek: Μουσικό Μήνυμα) was an original production for the Greek counterpart of the network, similar to Playback. It featured video clips, tributes, news and exclusive interviews from singers; it was presented by Banta Rapti.

See also
M-Net
Filmnet
SuperSport (South African TV channel)

References

External links

Greek-language television stations
Television channels and stations established in 1990
Television channels and stations established in 1993
Television channels and stations disestablished in 1997
Television channels and stations disestablished in 2001
Television channels and stations disestablished in 2002
Television channels and stations disestablished in 2011
Defunct mass media in South Africa
Defunct television channels in Greece
Defunct television channels in Cyprus
Defunct television channels in Sweden
Defunct television channels in Norway
Defunct television channels in Denmark
Defunct television channels in Finland
Defunct television channels in the Netherlands

el:Filmnet#K-T.V.